The economy of Nicaragua is focused primarily on the agricultural sector. Nicaragua itself is the least developed country in Central America, and the second poorest in the Americas by nominal GDP. In recent years, under the administrations of Daniel Ortega, the Nicaraguan economy has expanded somewhat, following the Great Recession, when the country's economy actually contracted by 1.5%, due to decreased export demand in the American and Central American markets, lower commodity prices for key agricultural exports, and low remittance growth. The economy saw 4.5% growth in 2010 thanks to a recovery in export demand and growth in its tourism industry. Nicaragua's economy continues to post growth, with preliminary indicators showing the Nicaraguan economy growing an additional 5% in 2011. Consumer Price inflation have also curtailed since 2008, when Nicaragua's inflation rate hovered at 19.82%. In 2009 and 2010, the country posted lower inflation rates, 3.68% and 5.45%, respectively.
Remittances are a major source of income, equivalent to 15% of the country's GDP, which originate primarily from Costa Rica, the United States, and European Union member states. Approximately one million Nicaraguans contribute to the remittance sector of the economy.

In early 2004, Nicaragua secured some $4.5 billion in foreign debt reduction under the International Monetary Fund and World Bank Heavily Indebted Poor Countries initiative.  In April 2006, the US-Central America Free Trade Agreement went into effect, expanding export opportunities for Nicaragua's agricultural and manufactured goods. Textiles and apparel account for nearly 60% of Nicaragua's exports. In October 2007, the IMF approved an additional poverty reduction and growth facility program in support of the government's economic plans.  Nicaragua relies on international economic assistance to meet internal- and external-debt financing obligations, although foreign donors curtailed this funding in response to widespread allegations of electoral fraud in Nicaragua's November 2008 elections.

Economic history

Nicaragua's economy was devastated in the 1980s by the Contra War, which saw the destruction of much of the country's infrastructure. At the same time, the US staged an economic blockade from 1985 onward.

Following the civil war, Nicaragua began free market reforms, privatizing more than 350 state companies and commencing a general trend of economic growth.  Inflation has been reduced from 33,603% during the later years of the Sandinista period and 55,000% during the first year of the Chamorro government to more normal levels, averaging an annual rate of 9.5% over the 2000-2010 decade (based on World Bank figures).

Growth was slow (3%) in 2001 due to a combination of factors (a global recession, a series of bank failures, low coffee prices, and a drought), and in 2009 the economy actually contracted 1.5% in reaction to the 2008–2012 global recession). But even with the recessions, growth has averaged 3.4% between 2001 and 2011 (based on World Bank figures).

Economy 
Unemployment is 6.4%. Nicaragua suffers from persistent trade and budget deficits and a high debt-service burden, leaving it highly dependent on foreign assistance—which represented almost 25% of GDP in 2001.

One of the key engines of economic growth has been production for export. Although traditional products such as coffee, meat, and sugar continued to lead the list of Nicaraguan exports, the fastest growth is now in nontraditional exports: textile and apparel; gold; seafood; and new agricultural products such as peanuts, sesame, melons, and onions. In 2007, exports topped US$1 billion for the first time in Nicaraguan history.

Nicaragua is primarily an agricultural country, but construction, mining, fisheries, and general commerce also have been expanding during the last few years. Foreign private capital inflows topped $300 million in 1999 but, due to economic and political uncertainty, fell to less than $100 million in 2001. In the last 12 years, tourism has grown 394%, the rapid growth has led it to become Nicaragua's second largest source of foreign capital. Less than three years ago, the nation's tourism budget was U.S. $400,000; today, it is over $2 million. Nicaragua's economy has also produced a construction boom, the majority of which is in and around Managua.

Nicaragua faces a number of challenges in stimulating rapid economic growth. An International Monetary Fund (IMF) program is currently being followed, with the aim of attracting investment, creating jobs, and reducing poverty by opening the economy to foreign trade. This process was boosted in late 2000 when Nicaragua reached the decision point under the Heavily Indebted Poor Countries (HIPC) debt relief initiative. However, HIPC benefits were delayed because Nicaragua subsequently fell "off track" from its IMF program. The country also has been grappling with a string of bank failures that began in August 2000. Moreover, Nicaragua continues to lose international reserves due to its growing fiscal deficits.

The country is still a recovering economy and it continues to implement further reforms, on which aid from the IMF is conditional. In 2005, finance ministers of the leading eight industrialized nations (G8) agreed to forgive some of Nicaragua's foreign debt, as part of the HIPC program. According to the World Bank Nicaragua's GDP was around $4.9 US billion dollars. Recently, in March 2007, Poland and Nicaragua signed an agreement to write off $30.6 million which was borrowed by the Nicaraguan government in the 1980s.

The U.S. is the country's largest trading partner, providing 25% of Nicaragua's imports and receiving about 60% of its exports. About 25 wholly or partly owned subsidiaries of U.S. companies operate in Nicaragua. The largest of those operations are in the energy, communications, manufacturing, fisheries, and shrimp farming sectors. Opportunities exist for expanded foreign investments in those sectors, as well as in tourism, mining, franchising, and the distribution of imported consumer, manufacturing, and agricultural goods. There also are copper mines in northeastern Nicaragua.

Gross Domestic Product (GDP) in purchasing power parity (PPP) in 2012 was estimated at US$20.04 billion, and GDP per capita in PPP at US$3,300, making Nicaragua the second poorest country in the Western Hemisphere. The service sector is the largest component of GDP at 56.7%, followed by the industrial sector at 25.8%(2012). Agriculture represents 17.5% of GDP and it's the largest percentage in a Central American country. Nicaraguan labor force is estimated at 2.961 million of which 28% is occupied in agriculture, 19% in the industry sector and 53% in the service sector (2012).

Agriculture and food production

Coffee became Nicaragua's principal crop in the 1870s, a position it still held in 1992 despite the growing importance of other crops. Cotton gained importance in the late 1940s, and in 1992 was the second biggest export earner. In the early 20th century, Nicaraguan governments were reluctant to give concessions to the large United States banana companies, and bananas never attained the level of prominence in Nicaragua that they reached in Nicaragua's Central American neighbors; bananas were grown in the country, however, and were generally the third largest export earner in the post-World War II period. Beef and animal byproducts, the most important agricultural export for the three centuries before the coffee boom of the late 19th century, were still important commodities in 1992.

From the end of World War II to the early 1960s, the growth and diversification of the agricultural sector drove the nation's economic expansion. From the early 1960s until the increased fighting in 1977 caused by the Sandinista revolution, agriculture remained a robust and significant part of the economy, although its growth slowed somewhat in comparison with the previous postwar decades. Statistics for the next fifteen years, however, show stagnation and then a drop in agricultural production.

The agricultural sector declined precipitously in the 1980s. Until the late 1970s, Nicaragua's agricultural export system generated 40 percent of the country's GDP, 60 percent of national employment, and 80 percent of foreign exchange earnings. Throughout the 1980s, the Contras destroyed or disrupted coffee harvests as well as other key income-generating crops. Private industry stopped investing in agriculture because of uncertain returns. Land was taken out of production of export crops to expand plantings of basic grain. Many coffee plants succumbed to disease.

In 1989, the fifth successive year of decline, farm production declined by roughly 7 percent in comparison with the previous year. Production of basic grains fell as a result of Hurricane Joan in 1988 and a drought in 1989. By 1990 agricultural exports had declined to less than half the level of 1978. The only bright spot was the production of nontraditional export crops such as sesame, tobacco, and African palm oil.

Services
The service sector was estimated to account for 56.8% of the country's GDP, and employs 52% of the active population. This section includes transportation, commerce, warehousing, restaurant and hotels, arts and entertainment, health, education, financial and banking services, telecommunications as well as public administration and defense.

Tourism in Nicaragua is one of the most important industries in the country. It is the second largest source of foreign exchange for the country and is predicted to become the first largest industry in 2007. The growth in tourism has positively affected the agricultural, commercial, finance, and construction industries as well.

Current economic outlook

Nicaragua has ratified Free Trade Agreements with major markets such as the United States, the Dominican Republic (DR-CAFTA), Taiwan and Mexico, among others. As evidence of continuous efforts in improving the business climate, Nicaragua has been ranked favorably in a variety of independent evaluations.

The 2011 Doing Business Report, published by The World Bank Group, a report that benchmarks various indicators of the investment climate in 183 nations, ranked Nicaragua as the top location in Central America in starting a business, investor protection, and closing a business. Additionally, the country improved in the following categories: ease of doing business, registering property, paying taxes, trading across borders and enforcing contracts.

Data 
The following table shows the main economic indicators in 1980–2020 (with IMF staff stimtates in 2021–2026). Inflation below 5% is in green.

Other statistics

Household income or consumption by percentage share:
lowest 10%: 1.4%; highest 10%: 41.8 (2005)

Industrial production growth rate:
2.4% (2005)

Electricity - production:
2.778 billion kWh (2006)

Electricity - production by source:
fossil fuel: 53.43%; hydro: 35.34%; nuclear: 0%; other: 11.23% (1998). A large number of wind turbines have been installed along the SW shore of Lake Nicaragua since, and some geothermal plants have been constructed as well. 
As of 2013, the breakdown was: fossil fuel: 50%; wind power: 15%; geothermal: 16%, hydropower: 12%, 
biomass power: 7%.

Electricity - consumption:
2.929 billion kWh (2006)

Electricity - exports:
69.34 million kWh (2006)

Electricity - imports:
0 kWh (2006)

Agriculture - products:
coffee, bananas, sugarcane, cotton, rice, corn, tobacco, sesame, soya, beans; beef, veal, pork, poultry, dairy products; shrimp, lobsters

Exports - commodities:
coffee, beef, shrimp and lobster, cotton, tobacco, peanuts, sugar, bananas; gold

Imports - commodities:
consumer goods, machinery and equipment, raw materials, petroleum products

Currency:
1 gold Cordoba (C$) = 100 centavos

Exchange rates:
gold Córdoba (C$) per US$1 – 17.582 (2006), 16.733 (2005), 15.937 (2004), 15.105 (2003), 14.251 (2002)

Price inflation: 
 2007: 16.88%
 2008: 13.37%

See also

 Healthcare in Nicaragua
 Banking in Nicaragua
 Tourism in Nicaragua
 Agriculture in Nicaragua
 Nicaragua and the World Bank

Notes

References

External links
U.S./Nicaraguan embassy economic reports
Labor Conditions in the Nicaraguan Sugar Industry A 2005 study by PASE and the International Labor Rights Fund
cia.gov factbook on Nicaragua